The Extraordinary and Plenipotentiary Ambassador of Peru to the Republic of the Philippines was the official representative of the Republic of Peru to the Republic of the Philippines. The ambassador in Manila was also accredited to neighbouring Malaysia and Indonesia.

Both countries established relations in 1974, and Peru maintained an embassy in Manila until 2003. Since the embassy's closure, Peru has been represented to the Philippines from its embassy in Bangkok.

List of representatives

See also
List of ambassadors of Peru to Thailand
List of ambassadors of Peru to Indonesia

References

Philippines
Peru